The Sichuan Daily is a leading Chinese language daily newspaper based in Chengdu, Sichuan, China with a circulation of 8,000,000 as of 2012.

External links 
 Official Website of Sichuan Daily

Chinese-language newspapers (Simplified Chinese)
Daily newspapers published in China
Publications with year of establishment missing
Mass media in Chengdu